Neokaisareia ("New Caesarea"), can refer to:

 the historical city of Neokaisareia in the Pontus, now Niksar in Turkey
 the village of Neokaisareia, Pieria in northern Greece, founded by Pontic refugees